Globemaster Air Cargo was a cargo airline based in St. Albert, Alberta, Canada. It was an all-cargo airline operating scheduled and charter services in Alberta, British Columbia and the Northwest Territories.

History 

The airline was established in 2003.

Destinations 

Globemaster Air Cargo operated freight services to the following domestic scheduled destinations in January 2005: Edmonton, Fort Nelson, Fort McMurray, Fort St John, Grand Prairie, Inuvik and Yellowknife.

Fleet 
The Globemaster Air Cargo fleet consisted of 1 Raytheon Beech 1900C Airliner aircraft in January 2005.

See also 
 List of defunct airlines of Canada

References

External links 
Edmonton Airport Globemaster information

Defunct airlines of Canada
Airlines established in 2003
Airlines disestablished in 2004
Companies based in Alberta
St. Albert, Alberta
2003 establishments in Alberta
2004 disestablishments in Alberta